Rain on the City is the eighth studio album by singer-songwriter Freedy Johnston. It was released in 2010 on Bar/None Records. It is Johnston's first album of original material since 2001's Right Between the Promises.

Reception
AllMusic's Mark Deming said the album "strikes a more comfortable balance between the bright and blue sides of Johnston's musical personality, and in terms of getting a sound that suits his songs, this is his most effective set since This Perfect World in 1994." He continues that "Johnston also seems to have gotten his stride back as a songwriter, and these 11 tunes are full of the sharp but thoughtful wordplay and unique characters that make his best work so pleasurable." And concludes "this collection is a beautiful example of Johnston playing to his strengths and reminding us why he's one of the best and most singular American songwriters at work today. With any luck, it won't take quite so long for him to make something this comfortable but pleasantly surprising again."

Track listing
All songs written by Freedy Johnston.
"Lonely Penny" – 3:48
"Don't Fall in Love with a Lonely Girl" – 4:08
"Rain on the City" – 5:24
"Venus is Her Name" – 3:04
"The Other Side of Love" – 3:06
"The Devil Raises His Own" – 4:51
"Livin' Too Close to the Rio Grande" – 3:08
"Central Station" – 2:59
"The Kind of Love We're In" – 3:54
"It's Gonna Come Back to You" – 2:41
"What You Cannot See, You Cannot Fight" – 4:00

Personnel
Freedy Johnston – vocals, guitar, ukulele
Richard McLaurin – acoustic and electric guitar, lap steel, pedal steel, bass, piano, rhodes, percussion, accordion, mandolin, background vocals
Rich Malloy – drums
Pete Abbott – drums, percussion, piano, rhodes
David Santos – bass
Billy Mercer – bass
Bryn Davies – bass
Joe McMahan – acoustic and electric guitar, pedal steel
David Briggs – wurlitzer
Steve Conn – accordion, B3
John Lancaster – piano, B3
Steve Herman – flugel horn
Chris Carmichael – strings
Jason Eskridge – background vocals
Daniel Tashian – background vocals
Kate York – background vocals

References

2010 albums
Freedy Johnston albums
Bar/None Records albums